The 1977 Birmingham WCT was a men's tennis tournament played on indoor carpet courts. It was the fifth edition of the Grand Prix Birmingham, and part of the 1977 World Championship Tennis circuit. It took place in Birmingham, Alabama, United States from January 12 through January 16, 1977. First-seeded Jimmy Connors won his fourth consecutive singles title at the event.

Finals

Singles 
 Jimmy Connors defeated  Bill Scanlon 6–3, 6–3
 It was Connors' 1st singles title of the year and the 54th of his career.

Doubles 
 Wojciech Fibak /  Tom Okker defeated  Billy Martin /  Bill Scanlon 6–3, 6–4

References

External links
 ITF tournament edition details

Birmingham International
Birmingham International
Birmingham International
Birmingham International